The 36th Golden Globe Awards, honoring the best in film and television for 1978, were held on January 27, 1979.

Winners and nominees

Film

Television

Best Series - Drama
 60 Minutes
Battlestar Galactica
Family
Holocaust
Lou Grant

Best Series - Comedy or Musical
 Taxi
Alice
All in the Family
The Love Boat
Three's Company

Best Actor - Drama Series
 Michael Moriarty - Holocaust
Edward Asner - Lou Grant
James Garner - The Rockford Files
Richard Hatch - Battlestar Galactica
John Houseman - The Paper Chase
Michael Landon - Little House on the Prairie

Best Actress - Drama Series
 Rosemary Harris - Holocaust
Kate Jackson - Charlie's Angels
Kristy McNichol - Family
Lee Remick - Wheels
Sada Thompson - Family

Best Actor - Comedy or Musical Series
 Robin Williams - Mork and Mindy
Alan Alda - M*A*S*H
Gavin MacLeod - The Love Boat
Judd Hirsch - Taxi
John Ritter - Three's Company

Best Actress - Comedy or Musical Series
 Linda Lavin - Alice
Carol Burnett - The Carol Burnett Show
Penny Marshall - Laverne & Shirley
Suzanne Somers - Three's Company
Jean Stapleton - All in the Family

Best Supporting Actor
 Norman Fell - Three's Company
Jeff Conaway - Taxi
Danny DeVito - Taxi
Pat Harrington, Jr. - One Day at a Time
Andy Kaufman - Taxi

Best Supporting Actress
 Polly Holliday - Alice
Marilu Henner - Taxi
Julie Kavner - Rhoda
Linda Kelsey - Lou Grant
Audra Lindley - Three's Company
Nancy Walker - Rhoda

See also
51st Academy Awards
30th Primetime Emmy Awards
31st Primetime Emmy Awards
 32nd British Academy Film Awards
 33rd Tony Awards
 1978 in film
 1978 in television

References
IMdb 1979 Golden Globe Awards

036
1978 film awards
1978 television awards
January 1979 events in the United States
Golden Globe